Problepsis plagiata is a moth of the  family Geometridae. It is found from north-eastern China to Japan, Korea and south-eastern Russia.

References

Moths described in 1881
Scopulini
Moths of Asia